Joanna Ruocco is a prize-winning American author and co-editor of the fiction journal Birkensnake. In 2013, she received the Pushcart Prize for her story "If the Man Took" and is also winner of the Catherine Doctorow Innovative Fiction Prize. Ruocco received her MFA at Brown, and a Ph.D. in creative writing from the University of Denver. Her most recent novel is Dan, published by Dorothy, a publishing project. She also serves as assistant professor in creative writing at Wake Forest University.

Ruocco has also published romance novels under the pseudonyms Toni Jones and Alessandra Shahbaz.

Works
 The Mothering Coven (Ellipsis Press, 2009). 
 Man's Companions (Tarpaulin Sky Press, 2010)
 A Compendium of Domestic Incidents (Noemi Press, 2011)
 Another Governess/The Least Blacksmith-A Diptych (FC2, 2012).
 Dan (Dorothy, 2014)

References

 Wake Forest English faculty bios
 Brown University Writers Online for Joanna Ruocco
 Dorothy title page for Dan

Living people
American women novelists
Year of birth missing (living people)
Place of birth missing (living people)
21st-century American novelists
21st-century American women writers
Brown University alumni
University of Denver alumni
Wake Forest University faculty
American women academics